Jacques Delamain (10 September 1874, Jarnac – 5 February 1953, Saint-Brice, Charente)  was a French naturalist  who specialised in ornithology. He wrote Why Birds Sing, which was translated to English by Ruth and Anna Sarason, and published in 1932.

References
Ronsil, René (1948). Bibliographie ornithologique française. Tome I. Bibliographie. Paul Lechevalier, Paris, 534 p.

French ornithologists
1953 deaths
1874 births